Tullamore is a town in County Offaly, Ireland.

Tullamore may also refer to:

Tullamore, New South Wales, Australia
Tullamore, Ontario, Canada
Tullamore (UK Parliament constituency)
Tullamore railway station, Ireland
 Tullamore Show, an agricultural show in Tullamore, Ireland
 Tullamore Show (NSW), an agricultural show in Tullamore, New South Wales, Australia
Tullamore Town F.C., Ireland
Baron Tullamore
Sarah Tullamore